Cristian Suarino (born 23 April 1990) is an Italian football midfielder who currently plays for Aversa Normanna in the Italian Lega Pro Seconda Divisione.

Club career

Calcio Catania
A Napoli native, Suarino actually began his professional career with Sicilian side, Calcio Catania, where he was promoted from the club's youth academy in 2010. He was sent on a loan deal to Lega Pro Seconda Divisione outfit, S.S. Cassino 1927 in 2010, making 3 first team appearances during his loan period. Following his return to Catania in June 2010, Suarino joined neighboring minnows, S.S. Milazzo on a season-long loan deal where he went on to make 24 league appearances during the 2010-11 statistical season. Following another return to parent-club, Catania, Suarino joined Serie B outfit Nocerina on 30 June 2011 on a new temporary loan deal. With Nocerina, the young midfielder spent much of the 2011-12 Serie B campaign with the youth squad, earning just 6 first team call-ups.

Suarino was then loaned out to the Lega Pro Seconda Divisione for the second time in his career. He joined A.S. Melfi on loan for the 2012-13 Lega Pro season. He was a regular for the club, making 32 league appearances and scoring 3 goals following his official transfer on 19 August 2012. Upon his return to Catania, his contract was terminated by the club on 26 June 2013.

Aversa Normanna
On 27 July 2013, after nearly a month without a club, Suarino signed with S.F. Aversa Normanna as a free agent. He signed for the fourth division club alongside Fabio De Luca.

References

External links

1990 births
Living people
Italian footballers
Association football midfielders
Catania S.S.D. players
S.F. Aversa Normanna players
A.S.G. Nocerina players
A.S.D. Cassino Calcio 1924 players